The 1963 CONCACAF Championship was the first edition of the CONCACAF Championship, the football championship of North America, Central America and the Caribbean (CONCACAF). The tournament was held between 23 March to 7 April. Nine teams participated in the inaugural event.

The tournament was hosted by El Salvador in the cities of San Salvador and Santa Ana. The nine teams were broken up into one group of five and one group of four; the top two teams of each group would advance to a final group stage, playing in round-robin format to determine the winner. The tournament was won by Costa Rica, who defeated the hosts El Salvador 1–4 in the deciding match of the four-team final group.

Qualifying tournament

Venues

Final tournament

First round

Group A

Group B

Final round

Statistics

Goalscorers

References

External links 
1963 CONCACAF Championship on RSSSF
 Article on CONCACAF website with information about the tournament (archived link)

CONCACAF Championship
International association football competitions hosted by El Salvador
Championship
CONCACAF Championship
CONCACAF Championship
CONCACAF Championship
CONCACAF Championship
CONCACAF Championship
CONCACAF Championship
CONCACAF Championship
CONCACAF Championship
Sports competitions in San Salvador
20th century in San Salvador
Santa Ana Department
CONCACAF Championship
CONCACAF Championship